Michael Stahl (born 15 September 1987 in Diez) is a German footballer who plays as a midfielder/Defender for and manages TuS Koblenz. On 26 October 2010, he scored a goal from 61.5 metres in a DFB-Pokal match against Hertha BSC which Koblenz went on to win 2–1. The goal was voted as the ARD Goal of the Month and as the Goal of the Year.

References

External links
 
 

1987 births
Living people
German footballers
Association football defenders
Association football midfielders
FC Schalke 04 players
VfR Aalen players
TuS Koblenz players
2. Bundesliga players
3. Liga players
Regionalliga players